Charles Keith Taylor  (born 23 June 1931) was a Progressive Conservative member of the House of Commons of Canada. He was a lawyer by profession.

Keith Taylor was born at Portage la Prairie, Manitoba. He was first elected at the Churchill riding in the 1972 general election. He served his term in the 29th Parliament, but did not campaign for a second term in that office in the 1974 election.

Electoral history

External links
 
 CBC News - Canada Votes 2006: Churchill

1931 births
Living people
Members of the House of Commons of Canada from Manitoba
People from Portage la Prairie
Progressive Conservative Party of Canada MPs